Idaea bonifata is a moth in the family Geometridae. It is found in North America, where it has been recorded from Arizona, California, Georgia, Illinois, Kentucky, Maryland, Nevada, New Mexico, Oklahoma, Pennsylvania, Tennessee and Utah.

The length of the forewings is 6–7 mm. Adults are on wing from March to October.

The larvae feed on decaying leaves and stored grains.

References

Moths described in 1886
Sterrhini
Moths of North America